Charles-René Reynaud (or Reyneau), (1656, Brissac – 24 February 1728, Paris) was a French mathematician.

Biography 
A priest of the Oratory of Saint Philip Neri, father Reyneau was successively professor of philosophy at Toulon and Pézenas, and then of mathematics at the college of Angers.

His Analyse démontrée is a collection of the main theories prevalent in works of (?) etc. ; Reyneau added demonstrations or offered better ones.

Publications 
 Analyse démontrée, ou la Méthode de résoudre les problèmes de mathématiques, Paris, 1708, 2 t., in one vol. in-4°
 Several editions online at Hathi Trust Digital Library, including la deuxième, Paris, Quillau, 1736-1738
 Science du calcul des grandeurs en général, ou Éléments de mathématiques, Paris, J. Quillau, 1714-35, 2 vol. in-4°, with figures
 Edition online at Hathi Trust

Sources 
 Joseph-Marie Quérard, La France littéraire, vol.7, Paris, Firmin Didot, 1835, .

External links 
 Charles Reyneau on data.bnf.fr 
 Le calcul différentiel et intégral dans l’Analyse démontrée de Charles René Reyneau

17th-century French mathematicians
18th-century French mathematicians
Members of the French Academy of Sciences
1656 births
1728 deaths